The 2014 Remus F3 Cup was the 33rd Austria Formula 3 Cup season and the second Remus F3 Cup season.

Thomas Amweg of Jo Zeller Racing was crowned champion by 127 points over Inter Europol Competition driver Jakub Smiechowski. Florian Schnitzenbaumer became the Trophy class champion for the first time.

Teams and drivers
All Cup cars were built between 2005 and 2011, while Trophy cars were built between 1992 and 2004.

Numbers used at Remus F3 Cup events listed; numbers used at races run to F2 Italian Trophy regulations displayed in tooltips.

Calendar and race results
Round 6 (Imola) was held together with the F2 Italian Trophy. Italian F2 Trophy competitors were ineligible to score Remus F3 Cup points.

Championship standings

Cup

Trophy

Swiss F3 Cup

External links
Website of the AFR Cups [German]

Austria Formula 3 Cup
Remus
Remus F3 Cup